La Durantaye is a parish municipality in the Bellechasse Regional County Municipality in the Chaudière-Appalaches administrative region of Quebec.

The municipality had a population of 722 in the Canada 2011 Census.

Demographics 

References

Parish municipalities in Quebec
Incorporated places in Chaudière-Appalaches